The following lists events that happened during 1977 in Cambodia.

Incumbents 
 President: Khieu Samphan
 Prime Minister: Pol Pot

Events

January

February

March

April

May

June

July

August

September

October

November

December

References 

 
1970s in Cambodia
Years of the 20th century in Cambodia
Cambodia
Cambodia